Salah Bouchekriou (born 1962) is an Algerian handball player and coach.

He played for the Algerian national team and participated at the 1988 Summer Olympics, where the Algerian team placed tenth.

He is currently head coach for the Bahrain men's national handball team.

References

External links

1962 births
Living people
Algerian male handball players
Olympic handball players of Algeria
Handball players at the 1988 Summer Olympics
Algerian handball coaches
Algerian expatriates in Bahrain
21st-century Algerian people